The 2020–21 Kentucky Wildcats women's basketball team represents the University of Kentucky during the 2020–21 NCAA Division I women's basketball season. The Wildcats, led by head coach Kyra Elzy, play their home games at Memorial Coliseum and Rupp Arena and compete as members of the Southeastern Conference (SEC).

Roster

Preseason

SEC media poll
The SEC media poll was released on November 17, 2020.

Rankings

^Coaches' Poll did not release a second poll at the same time as the AP.

Schedule

|-
!colspan=9 style=| Non-conference regular season

|-
!colspan=9 style=| SEC regular season

|-
!colspan=9 style=| SEC Tournament

|-
!colspan=9 style=| NCAA tournament

References

Kentucky Wildcats women's basketball seasons
Kentucky
Kentucky Wildcats
Kentucky Wildcats
Kentucky